An evolutionary lineage is a temporal series of populations, organisms, cells, or genes connected by a continuous line of descent from ancestor to descendant. Lineages are subsets of the evolutionary tree of life. Lineages are often determined by the techniques of molecular systematics.

Phylogenetic representation of lineages 

Lineages are typically visualized as subsets of a phylogenetic tree. A lineage is a single line of descent or linear chain within the tree, while a clade is a (usually branched) monophyletic group, containing a single ancestor and all its descendants. Phylogenetic trees are typically created from DNA, RNA or protein sequence data. Apart from this, morphological differences and similarities have been, and still are used to create phylogenetic trees. Sequences from different individuals are collected and their similarity is quantified. Mathematical procedures are used to cluster individuals by similarity.

Just as a map is a scaled approximation of true geography, a phylogenetic tree is an approximation of the true complete evolutionary relationships. For example, in a full tree of life, the entire clade of animals can be collapsed to a single branch of the tree. However, this is merely a limitation of rendering space. In theory, a true and complete tree for all living organisms or for any DNA sequence could be generated.

See also

 Clade
 Linnaean taxonomy

References

External links

Phylogenetics